California State University, Fullerton (CSUF or Cal State Fullerton) is a public university in Fullerton, California. With a total enrollment of more than 41,000, it has the largest student body of the California State University (CSU) system, and its graduate student body of more than 5,000 is one of the largest in the CSU and in all of California. As of fall 2016, the school had 2,083 faculty, of whom 782 were on the tenure track. The university offers 109 degree programs: 55 undergraduate degrees and 54 graduate degrees, including three doctorates.

Cal State Fullerton is an Hispanic-serving institution (HSI) and is eligible to be designated as an Asian American Native American Pacific Islander serving institution (AANAPISI). The university is nationally accredited in art, athletic training, business, chemistry, communications, communicative disorders, computer science, dance, engineering, music, nursing, public administration, public health, social work, teacher education and theater. Spending related to CSUF generates an impact of around $2.26 billion to the California and local economy, and sustains nearly 16,000 jobs statewide.

CSUF athletic teams compete in Division I of the NCAA and are collectively known as the CSUF Titans. They compete in the Big West Conference.

History

Founding
In 1957, Orange County State College became the 12th state college in California to be authorized by the state legislature as a degree-granting institution. The following year, a site was designated for the campus to be established in northeast Fullerton. The property was purchased in 1959. This is the same year that Dr. William B. Langsdorf was appointed as founding president of the school.

Classes began with 452 students in September 1959. The name of the school was changed to Orange State College in July 1962. In 1964, its name was changed to California State College at Fullerton. In June 1972, the final name change occurred and the school became California State University, Fullerton.

Mascot
The choice of the elephant as the university's mascot, dubbed Tuffy the Titan, dates to 1962, when the campus hosted "The First Intercollegiate Elephant Race in Human History." The May 11 event attracted 10,000 spectators, 15 pachyderm entrants, and worldwide news coverage.

Campus violence

The campus has seen three significant instances of violence with people shot and killed. On July 12, 1976, Edward Charles Allaway, a campus janitor with paranoid schizophrenia, shot nine people, killing seven, in the University Library (now the Pollak Library) on the Cal State Fullerton campus. At the time, it was the worst mass shooting in Orange County history. On October 13, 1984, Edward Cooperman, a physics professor, was shot and killed by his former student, Minh Van Lam, in McCarthy Hall.
On August 19, 2019, Steven Shek Keung Chan, 57, of Hacienda Heights was found by police with multiple stab wounds. When the police arrived at the parking lot where Chan was assaulted, he was pronounced dead. Chan was a retired budget director working as a consultant in the international student affairs office. On August 22, 2019, the coworker who committed the violent act was arrested at his residence in Huntington Beach. Chuyen Vo, 51, was believed to have acted alone, but the motive was never identified. Chan and Vo worked in the same division and Cal State Fullerton spokeswoman Ellen Treanor stated:"Of all the individuals that I talked to in that division, there didn't seem to be any concerns at all that anybody would ever hurt Steve at all. Not a single person said there were problems," Treanor said. "He wasn't known as a difficult boss. He was known as a very thoughtful man, very by-the book, a man of few words."

2000s: Modern growth
The university grew rapidly in the first decade of the 2000s. The Performing Arts Center was built in January 2006, and in the summer of 2008 the newly constructed Steven G. Mihaylo Hall and the new Student Recreation Center opened. 

In fall 2008, the Performing Arts Center was renamed the Joseph A.W. Clayes III Performing Arts Center, in honor of a $5 million pledge made to the university by the trustees of the Joseph A.W. Clayes III Charitable Trust. Since 1963, the curriculum has expanded to include many graduate programs, including multiple doctorate degrees, as well as numerous credential and certificate programs.

In 2021, president of the university Framroze Virjee acknowledged the university's location on the lands of the Tongva and Acjachemen and pledged for the university to be more committed toward partnering with Indigenous peoples.

Campus

The campus is on the site of former citrus groves in northeast Fullerton. It is bordered on the east by the Orange Freeway (SR-57), on the west by State College Boulevard, on the north by Yorba Linda Boulevard, and on the south by Nutwood Avenue.

Although established in the late 1950s, much of the initial construction on campus took place in the late 1960s, under the supervision of artist and architect Howard van Heuklyn, who gave the campus a striking, futuristic architecture (buildings like Pollak Library South, Titan Shops, Humanities, McCarthy Hall). This was in response to the numerous Googie buildings in the Fullerton community.

The Pollak Library houses the Philip K. Dick science fiction collection.

Since 1993, the campus has added the College Park Building, Steven G. Mihaylo Hall, University Hall, the Titan Student Union, the Student Recreation Center, the Nutwood Parking Structure, the State College Parking Structure, Dan Black Hall, Joseph A.W. Clayes III Performing Arts Center West, Phase III Housing, the Grand Central Art Center, and Pollak Library. In order to generate power for the university and become more sustainable, the campus installed solar panels on top of a number of buildings. The panels, which generate up to 7–8 percent of the electrical power used daily, are atop the Eastside Parking Structure, Clayes Performing Arts Center and the Kinesiology and Health Science Building.

In August 2011, the university added a $143 million housing complex, which included five new residence halls, a convenience store and a 565-seat dining hall called the Gastronome.

Satellite facilities

Proposed expansion
CSUF announced plans in May 2010 to buy the lot occupied by Hope International University, but this deal fell through.

CSUF also announced plans in September 2010 to expand into the area south of Nutwood Avenue to construct a project called CollegeTown, which would integrate the surrounding residential areas and retail spaces into the campus. After community opposition, the Fullerton planning commission indefinitely postponed any action on the project in February 2016.

Desert Studies Center
The Desert Studies Center is a field station of the California State University located in Zzyzx, California in the Mojave Desert. The purpose of the center is to provide opportunities to conduct research, receive instruction and experience the Mojave Desert environment. It is officially operated by the California Desert Studies Consortium, a consortium of 7 CSU campuses: Fullerton, Cal Poly Pomona, Long Beach, San Bernardino, Northridge, Dominguez Hills and Los Angeles.

Academics

CSUF's academic departments and programs are organized into four Liberal Arts colleges,
 College of the Arts
 Colleges of Humanities and Social Sciences 
 College of Natural Sciences and Mathematics
 College of Communications
and four vocational colleges
 College of Engineering and Computer Science
 College of Health and Human Development
 College of Business and Economics
 College of Education

Admissions and enrollment
Fall freshman statistics

As of the fall 2013 semester, CSUF is the third most applied to CSU out of all 23 campuses receiving nearly 65,000 applications, including over 40,000 for incoming freshmen and nearly 23,000 transfer applications, the second highest in the CSU.

Rankings and distinctions

The 2023 edition of U.S. News & World Report ranked Fullerton 7th for "Top Performers on Social Mobility," 83 in top public schools, tied 66 for best undergraduate teaching, 222 for best value schools, and the undergraduate engineering programs ranked 42, tied 7 in computer engineering, 12 civil engineering and 11 electrical/electronic/communications and 153 for Nursing.
The 2022 edition of U.S. News & World Report ranked Fullerton 3rd for "Top Performers on Social Mobility," tied 3rd for most innovative schools, 5th in top public schools, tied 6 for best undergraduate teaching, 41 for best value schools, and the undergraduate engineering programs ranked 29, 7 computer engineering, 8 civil engineering and 12 electrical/electronic/communications and 148 for Nursing.
The 2021 edition of U.S. News & World Report ranked Fullerton tied for 16th among 127 Western U.S. regional universities that offer some masters programs but few doctoral ones, and 4th best public university among 66. CSUF was also ranked tied for 9th out of 124 regional schools for "Top Performers on Social Mobility", and tied for 3rd out of 25 for "Best Undergraduate Teaching Programs".
Money magazine ranked Cal State Fullerton 34th in the country out of 739 schools evaluated for its 2020 "Best Colleges for Your Money" edition and 22nd in its list of the 50 best public schools in the U.S.

Athletics

CSUF participates in the NCAA Division I Big West Conference and MPSF. Cal State Fullerton Athletics boasts 31 national championships covering 11 sports and dating back to its first in 1967. There are 12 team national titles and 19 individual championships. The Titans became an NCAA Div. I program for the 1974-75 academic year and have since produced 11 (6 team and 5 individual) national titles, four of them by the Titans' baseball team. Eighteen of the titles come from men's sports, 12 from women's. 12 team national championships in eight different sports. (1970, women's basketball (CIAW); 1971, 1972, 1974 men's gymnastics; 1971 cross country team; 1973 women's fencing; 1979, women's gymnastics; 1979, 1984, 1995, 2004 baseball; 1986 softball). Their baseball team is a perennial national powerhouse with four national titles and dozens of players playing Major League Baseball. The CSUF Dance Team currently holds the most national titles at the school, with 15 national titles from UDA Division 1 Jazz; 2000, 2001, 2002, 2003, 2004, 2006, 2007, 2008, 2010, 2011, 2012, 2013, 2014, 2015, 2016 and 2017; and one national title from UDAs in Division 1 Hip Hop. The Dance Team also holds multiple titles from United Spirit Association.

CSUF holds the Ben Brown Invitational every track and field season. CSUF currently supports 21 club sports on top of its Division I varsity teams, which are archery, baseball, cycling, equestrian, grappling and jiu jitsu, ice hockey, men's lacrosse, women's lacrosse, nazara Bollywood dance, men's rugby, women's rugby, roller hockey, salsa team, men's soccer, women's soccer, table tennis, tennis, ultimate Frisbee, men's volleyball, women's volleyball, skiing, and wushu.

Because of the proximity to Long Beach State, the schools are considered rivals. The rivalry is especially heated in baseball with the Long Beach State baseball team also having a competitive college baseball program.

Student life

CSUF was the first college in Orange County to have a Greek system, with its first fraternity founded in 1960. The Daily Titan, the official student newspaper of the university, also started in 1960. Other official student media includes Titan Radio.

On April 23, 2014, Cal State Fullerton opened the Titan Dreamers Resource Center. The center was the first resource center for undocumented students in the CSU system.

Notable alumni

CSUF alumni include an astronaut who has made two trips to space; a speaker of the California Assembly; other politicians and Academy Award-winning directors, actors, producers, and cinematographers; award-winning journalists, authors, and screenwriters; nationally recognized teachers; presidents and CEOs of leading corporations; international opera stars, musicians, and Broadway stars; and professional athletes, Olympians, doctors, scientists, researchers, and social activists.

Titan alumni number more than 210,000. An active alumni association keeps them connected through numerous networking and social events, and also sponsors nationwide chapters.

Notes

References

External links

CSUF Portal
Cal State Fullerton Athletics website

 
Educational institutions established in 1957
Fullerton
California State University, Fullerton
Education in Fullerton, California
Universities and colleges in Orange County, California
Schools accredited by the Western Association of Schools and Colleges
1957 establishments in California